Adam Tanner may refer to:
Adam Tanner (footballer) (born 1973), English footballer
Adam Tanner (theologian) (1571-1632), Austrian Jesuit